Janira Isabel Fonseca Hopffer Almada (born 27 September 1978) is a lawyer and politician from Cape Verde who served as the president of the African Party for the Independence of Cape Verde (PAICV) from 2014 to 2021.

Early life and education
Almada was born on 27 September 1978 in Praia, Santiago Island. Her father is a lawyer and PAICV Minister of Justice David Hopffer Almada. She has a degree in law and a graduate degree in business law from the University of Coimbra in Portugal.

Career
Almada is a lawyer and worked as an associate at her father's firm, D. Hopffer Almada and Associates. She is a member of the Cape Verde Bar Association and was a teacher at the Jean Piaget University of Cape Verde from 2003 to 2006.

Almada was Municipal Representative in the 2008 municipal elections and was elected to parliament in 2011. She became Minister of Youth, Employment, and Human Resources Development.

Almada was elected leader of the PAICV on 14 December 2014 with 51.24% of the votes, succeeding José Maria Neves, becoming the party's youngest, as well as first female, president. She led the party to the 2016 elections; after the MpD party won a landslide victory, she announced her resignation.  However, she decided to run again at the next party convention, and won reelection as the party president.

In August 2016, Almada was invited to a congress held by the MPLA, the Popular Movement for the Liberation of Angola in Angola as a delegate, both parties linked to the struggle against colonialism and for independence.  Meetings were held between the participants of PAICV, MPLA and the Portuguese Socialist Party (PS) whose president is Carlos César and some others.

Almada resigned from the PAICV's leadership following another loss for her party during the 2021 elections.

External links
 PAICV profile

References

1978 births
Living people
African Party for the Independence of Cape Verde politicians
Cape Verdean women in politics
People from Praia
University of Coimbra alumni
21st-century women politicians